Batulicin Putra 69 (formerly known as PS Tanbu Putra) is an Indonesian football club based in Tanah Bumbu, South Kalimantan. They currently competes in Liga 3.

Honours
 Liga 3 South Kalimantan
 Runner-up: 2021

References

Football clubs in Indonesia
Football clubs in South Kalimantan
Sport in South Kalimantan
Association football clubs established in 2020
2020 establishments in Indonesia